George Horace Morgan (January 1, 1855 – February 14, 1948) was an American cavalry officer and Medal of Honor recipient.

Early life
George Horace Morgan was born in St. Catharines, Canada West, on January 1, 1855, to the Civil War general George N. Morgan.

Military career
Morgan was appointed to the U.S. Military Academy at West Point from Minnesota in 1876, graduating in 1880.  He was post commander of Fort Myer, Virginia, when he held the rank of major from March to June 1899.

Morgan served in all the United States' wars from the Indian Wars to World War I. He was wounded by an Apache in the Battle of Big Dry Wash in the Arizona Territory in 1882, for which he received the Medal of Honor. The bullet remained near his heart for over 60 years until it shifted in 1948 and caused his death. He is the namesake of Camp Morgan in Bosnia. Three other men, First Lieutenant Frank West, Second Lieutenant Thomas Cruse and First Sergeant Charles Taylor were also awarded Medals of Honor in this action. West and Cruse are also Academy graduates.

Colonel Morgan was an hereditary companion of the Military Order of the Loyal Legion of the United States by right of his father's service in the Union Army during the American Civil War.

Death and burial
Morgan attained the rank of colonel in April 1914, and retired on New Year's Day 1919. He is buried in Arlington National Cemetery.

Medal of Honor citation
Rank and organization: Second Lieutenant, 3d U.S. Cavalry. Place and date: At Big Dry Wash, Ariz., July 17, 1882. Entered service at: Minneapolis, Minn. Birth: Canada. Date of issue: July 15, 1892.

Citation:
Gallantly held his ground at a critical moment and fired upon the advancing enemy (hostile Indians) until he was disabled by a shot.

See also

 List of Medal of Honor recipients for the Indian Wars

References

External links
 

1855 births
1948 deaths
Canadian military personnel from Ontario
American military personnel of World War I
American military personnel of the Indian Wars
United States Army Medal of Honor recipients
Burials at Arlington National Cemetery
United States Army personnel of World War I
Canadian emigrants to the United States
United States Army colonels
United States Military Academy alumni
Canadian-born Medal of Honor recipients
American Indian Wars recipients of the Medal of Honor